The NOWSA (Network Of Women Students Australia) is an Australian feminist student organisation founded on ideals of creating a grassroots, autonomous network concerned with issues that impact women and women students.

Established in 1987, NOWSA provides a platform for women's organising across universities and in the wider community through resource, skill and knowledge sharing both in conference and through web branches of the network. The network continues to shift, grow and change, but constantly places feminist agenda at the forefront. Women of all ages, sexualities, abilities, and experiences have the opportunity to be involved.

The annual NOWSA conference is organised by a collective of women students and hosted by a different university in Australia each year.

The NOWSA conference usually runs for 5 days, giving voice to women students and allowing them to engage with personal, political, social, and cultural issues that are relevant to women. NOWSA is now an annual conference, held from year to year at different universities, and encourages networks to be developed with women from across Australia.

List of conferences

References

External links
Official website
 NOWSA 2012 conference website
 National Union of Students NOWSA post 2010
 Women of Colour blog speech from NOWSA 2010
 NOWSA 2008 Myspace Page
 International Women's Day broadsheet 1998

Student organisations in Australia
Feminist organisations in Australia
Recurring events established in 1987
1987 establishments in Australia